The 1990 Currie Cup Division A (known as the Santam Bank Currie Cup for sponsorship reasons) was the top division of the Currie Cup competition, the premier domestic rugby union competition in South Africa. This was the 52nd season since the competition started in 1889.

Teams

Changes between 1989 and 1990 seasons
  withdrew.
  were promoted from Division B.

Changes between 1990 and 1991 seasons

Competition

There were eight participating teams in the 1990 Currie Cup Division A. These teams played each other twice over the course of the season, once at home and once away. Teams received two points for a win and one points for a draw. The top two teams qualified for the title play-offs. The final was then played at the home venue of the team that finished first during the season.

Log

Fixtures and results

Round one

Round two

Round three

Round four

Round five

Round six

Round seven

Round eight

Round nine

Round ten

Round eleven

Round twelve

Round thirteen

Round fourteen

Round fifteen

Round sixteen

Final

See also
 1990 Currie Cup Division B
 1990 Santam Bank Trophy
 1990 Lion Cup

References

A
1990